Chuck Robert Salas (born in Dallas, Texas) was an American soccer forward who has played in the Continental Indoor Soccer League, Premier Soccer Alliance and USISL.  Salas last played for the Texas Outlaws in the Professional Arena Soccer League.

Salas attended Nimitz High School in Irving, Texas.  He played at least one season with the Texas Lightning during the 1995-1996 USISL indoor season.  He then played for the Mesquite Kickers during the 1996-1997 season.  He signed with the Dallas Sidekicks of the Continental Indoor Soccer League as a free agent for 1997 season.  In 1998, the Sidekicks moved to the Premier Soccer Alliance.  Salas earned one championship ring with the 1998 Dallas Sidekicks and scored his first professional goal on August 10, 1997 against Detroit Safari with an assist from David Doyle.  Salas retired in 2010, playing his last game in California against the San Diego Sockers.

External links
Texas Outlaws
Dallas Sidekicks

1977 births
Living people
American soccer players
Continental Indoor Soccer League players
Mesquite Kickers players
Dallas Lightning players
Dallas Sidekicks (CISL) players
Premier Soccer Alliance players
Professional Arena Soccer League players
USISL players
Association football forwards